Zahínos is a municipality located in the southwestern corner of the province of Badajoz, Extremadura, Spain. It is located close to the border with Portugal.

According to the 2014 census, the municipality has a population of 2864 inhabitants.

References

External links

Municipalities in the Province of Badajoz